Dariya Derkach (born 27 March 1993) is an Italian female long jumper and triple jumper. She competed at the 2020 Summer Olympics, in Triple jump.

Biography
She was born in Ukraine but has been an Italian citizen since 27 May 2013. She has lived in the town of Pagani (close to Naples) in Italy with her parents since 2002. Her father, Serhiy (a former decathlete), is her coach. She trains in Formia where she has lived since the end of 2014. Her mother Oksana Derkach was a good triple jumper.

Her best results in triple jump is 13.56 m, the 4th best European under-23 jump in 2011, and 6.55 m in long jump, the 2nd best European under-23 jump in 2011. She has participated four times in the European championships (two outdoor and two indoor), one Olympic Games and one World Championships, on six of these seven occasions without being able to pass the qualifying round for the final.

National records
 Long jump (junior): 6.67 m ( Rieti, 15 June 2013) - current holder

Achievements

National titles
Dariya Derkach has won 13 times the individual senior national championship and 7 at junior level. She won her first senior national championship in 2014.

Senior (13)
Italian Athletics Championships
Triple jump: 2014, 2016, 2017, 2020, 2021, 2022 (6)
Italian Athletics Indoor Championships
Long jump: 2014 (1)
Triple jump: 2015, 2017, 2020, 2021, 2022, 2023 (6)

Junior (7)
4 wins in long jump (2010, 2011, 2012, 2013)
3 wins in triple jump (2011, 2012, 2013)

See also
 Italian all-time top lists - Long jump
 Italian all-time lists - Triple jump

References

External links
 

1993 births
Italian female long jumpers
Italian female triple jumpers
Living people
Naturalised citizens of Italy
Athletes (track and field) at the 2016 Summer Olympics
Olympic athletes of Italy
World Athletics Championships athletes for Italy
Athletics competitors of Centro Sportivo Aeronautica Militare
Sportspeople from the Province of Salerno
Ukrainian emigrants to Italy
Athletes (track and field) at the 2018 Mediterranean Games
Mediterranean Games competitors for Italy
Italian Athletics Championships winners
Athletes (track and field) at the 2020 Summer Olympics